Yeşiltepe (literally "green hill" in Turkish) may refer to:

 The Turkish name of Elia, Kyrenia, Cyprus
 Yeşiltepe, Adıyaman, a village in the district of Adıyaman, Adıyaman Province, Turkey
 Yeşiltepe, Aksaray, a village in the district of Aksaray, Aksaray Province, Turkey
 Yeşiltepe, Amasya, a village in the district of Amasya, Amasya Province, Turkey
 Yeşiltepe, Çelikhan, a village in the district of Çelikhan, Adıyaman Province, Turkey
 Yeşiltepe, Cumayeri
 Yeşiltepe, İspir
 Yeşiltepe, Kaynaşlı
 Yeşiltepe, Tarsus, a town in the district of Tarsus, Mersin Province, Turkey
 Yeşiltepe, Taşova, a village in the district of Taşova, Amasya Province, Turkey
 Yeşiltepe, Vezirköprü, a village in the district of Vezirköprü, Samsun Province, Turkey